Chaetocalirrhoe is a genus of bristle flies in the family Tachinidae. There is at least one described species in Chaetocalirrhoe, C. grandis.

Distribution
Haiti.

References

Dexiinae
Diptera of North America
Taxa named by Charles Henry Tyler Townsend
Tachinidae genera